Shinosaur ( (lit. Tyre-saur), officially: "Art-construction "Dragon"") - is the most famous street-art object of the Moscow housing and public utilities art, built in 1971 (according to other sources, in 1987) and destroyed in 2022, despite the protests of residents and promises of the authorities to preserve the object.

History 

According to the oral reports of the authorities, the Shinosaur existed at this place since 1971, local residents in their memories indicate 1987 or the beginning of the 1990s. According to the same recollections, the Shinosaur was created by car enthusiasts from neighboring garages, and the material (tires) was most likely brought from the First Automobile Plant named after G. L. Krause, which is located on the opposite side of Mnevniki.

For the past 30 years, the Shinosaur has been a local favorite, climbed (and fell) by children.

In the spring of 2022, plans for the improvement of the courtyard between buildings 10-1 and 10-4 along Mnevniki Street appeared. The head of the Council assured the worried residents that the Shinosaur would not be touched.

However, on July 6, 2022, Shinosaur was demolished.

Description 

The basis of the structure is a steel pipe, bent at an angle to the horizon and tightly welded with several shorter pipes that act as a holding cross ("paw"). At the highest point, a corner is welded to the pipe across it, after which the pipe bends down in an arc, ending with a rubber tongue. Throughout the pipes, automobile tires  of various diameters, from cars to tractors, are strung on them. Since the mid-2000s, tires have been painted in bright colors (first purple with red, then blue with yellow and red). Prior to this, the monument was black. In general, the structure vaguely resembled the Loch Ness Monster.

Influence 
The popularity of the Shinosaur was so high that the locals filled themselves with tattoos with his image.

Sources 
 Шинозавр разрушен. Почему в Москве демонтировали главный символ ЖКХ-арта
 lenta.ru/news/2022/09/07/no_shinozavr/ Замена Шинозавра возмутила москвичей // Lenta
 Названы исчезнувшие с улиц столицы объекты ЖКХ-арта // Moslenta
 На месте снесённого Шинозавра поставили нелепого зелёного дракона
 ezhick.online/2022/07/07/11917/net-bolshe-shinozavra/ Нет больше шинозавра
 Шинозавр: конец эпохи
 Ушла эпоха: гигантского шинозавра снесли
 Новостной репортаж на НТВ
 Чтобы было красиво // Meduza.io, 2021 (прижизненная публикация)
 Нора Ёжика

Demolished buildings and structures in Moscow